St Mary's Church or St Mary of the Annunciation Church is a Roman Catholic parish church in Loughborough, Leicestershire, England. It was built in 1834 in the neoclassical style and has been served by the Rosminians since 1841, it was their first church in the UK, and outside of Italy. It is located opposite the junction of Ashby Road and Radmoor Road to the west of the town centre. It is a Grade II listed building.

History

Construction
In 1833, Fr Benjamin Hulme came to Loughborough and started a mission there. He organised the purchasing of the site of the current church and commissioned an architect, William Flint from Leicester, to design the church. In 1834, the church and the presbytery next to it were built.

Rosminians
In 1838, the Rosminians were ratified in Rome. In 1839, the first of Rosminian vows were made. The only country the Rosminians worked in, outside of Italy, was the UK. In 1841, led by Aloysius Gentili, they began serving the church. In 1845, from the church, they founded Radcliffe College.

Extension
In 1920s, the church was enlarged. A new nave and portico entrance were added facing on to the street. They were designed by  a local architect A. M. Barrowcliffe. In 1933, a new high altar was consecrated. In 1937, marble altar rails were added. The parts of the church from before the extensions were added became the chancel, Lady chapel and sacristy.

Parish
St Mary's Church is its own parish. It has four Sunday Masses at 6:00pm on Saturday, 9:00am and 11:15am on Sunday and a Mass in Italian at 4:00pm on Sunday.

See also
 Diocese of Nottingham

References

External links
 
 Rosminians UK

Loughborough
Roman Catholic churches in Leicestershire
Grade II listed churches in Leicestershire
19th-century Roman Catholic church buildings in the United Kingdom
Roman Catholic churches completed in 1834
Grade II listed Roman Catholic churches in England
1834 establishments in England
Rosminian churches in the United Kingdom
Neoclassical church buildings in England